The following is a list of notable deaths in October 1998.

Entries for each day are listed alphabetically by surname. A typical entry lists information in the following sequence:
 Name, age, country of citizenship at birth, subsequent country of citizenship (if applicable), reason for notability, cause of death (if known), and reference.

October 1998

1
Pauline Julien, 70, Quebec singer, songwriter, actress and feminist activist, suicide.
Sjur Lindebrække, 89, Norwegian banker and politician.
Vladimir Ossipoff, 90, Russian-American architect.
Gabriel Sandu, 45, Romanian football player.

2
Gene Autry, 91, American Hall of Fame singer ("Back in the Saddle Again", "Rudolph the Red-Nosed Reindeer") and actor (The Gene Autry Show), lymphoma.
Jerzy Bińczycki, 61, Polish stage and film actor, heart attack.
DONDI, 37, American graffiti artist, AIDS.
William J. Eccles, 81, Canadian historian and academic.
Olin J. Eggen, 79, American astronomer.
Olivier Gendebien, 74, Belgian racing driver.
Enrico Pagani, 69, Italian basketball player.
Korla Pandit, 77, American composer, pianist, and organist, heart attack.
Raymond Raikes, 88, British theatre producer, director and broadcaster.
D. French Slaughter, Jr., 73, American politician.
Adrian Spies, 78, American  screenwriter.
Roger Vivier, 90, French women's shoe designer.
Richard Way, 84, British civil servant and academic administrator.
Sanjaasürengiin Zorig, 36, Mongolian politician and revolutionary, assassinated.

3
Hugo Batalla, 72, Uruguayan politician, vice president (1995-1998), lung cancer.
Arthur Clues, 74, Australian rugby player.
George Davis, 84, American art director (The Robe, The Diary of Anne Frank, Funny Face), Oscar winner (1954, 1960).
David C. Evans, 74, American computer scientist.
Bernard Fox, 81, American figure skater.
Colin Greenwood, 62, South African rugby player.
Roddy McDowall, 70, British-American actor (Planet of the Apes, Cleopatra, Fright Night), lung cancer.
G. S. Venkataraman, 68, Indian botanist.
Anne-Marie Walters, 75, Swiss-British Special Operations Executive during World War II.
George Yates, 90, Australian businessman and politician.

4
S. Arasaratnam, 68, Sri Lankan academic, historian and author.
Jean-Pascal Delamuraz, 62, Swiss politician.
Lee Grissom, 90, American baseball player.
Enea Pavani, 77, Italian curler.
Tony Shelly, 61, New Zealand racing driver.

5
Megs Jenkins, 81, English actress.
Krzysztof Jung, 47, Polish painter, graphic artist and performer, asthma.
Pierre Martory, 77, French poet.
Federico Zeri, 77, Italian art historian.
Arne Øien, 69, Norwegian economist and politician.

6
Mark Belanger, 54, American baseball player, lung cancer.
Ambrose Burke, 102, English professor and Catholic priest.
Rolan Bykov, 68, Soviet and Russian actor, theatre and film director and screenwriter, lung cancer.
Bob Gude, 80, American football player.
Jean-François Jenny-Clark, 54, French double bass player, cancer.
James Larkin, 66, Irish Gaelic football player and politician.
Samuel Messick, 67, American psychologist.
Stéphane Morin, 29, Canadian ice hockey player, heart problems.
Joseph J. Sandler, 71, British psychoanalyst.
Chuck Walton, 57, American gridiron football player.
Jerome Weidman, 85, American playwright and novelist.

7
Evelyn Daniel Anderson, 72, American educator and disability rights advocate.
Richard Cyert, 77, American economist and statistician, cancer.
Cees de Vreugd, 46, Dutch strongman, heart attack.
W. B. Gallie, 86, Scottish social theorist and philosopher.
Arnold Jacobs, 83, American tubist.
Renato Malavasi, 94, Italian film actor.
Joseph P. Merlino, 76, American Party politician.
Lee Nak-hoon, 62, South Korean actor, heart disease and diabetes.
Ru Zhijuan, 72, Chinese writer.

8
Curtis Cassell, 85, German-British rabbi.
Zhang Chongren, 91, Chinese artist and sculptor.
Mohanlal Lallubhai Dantwala, 89, Indian agricultural economist, academic and writer.
Jashim, 48, Bangladeshi film actor, producer and freedom fighter, brain haemorrhage.
West Nkosi, 58, South African music producer, saxophonist and songwriter, car crash.
Gigi Reder, 70, Italian character actor.
Glenn Spearman, 51, American jazz tenor saxophonist, cancer.
Anatol Vieru, 72, Romanian music theoretician, pedagogue, and composer.

9
Robert Allen, 92, American actor, cancer.
Anthony Alonzo, 50, Filipino actor, singer, and councilor of Quezon City, skin cancer.
Beth Bonner, 46, American long-distance runner, traffic accident.
George Rankine Irwin, 91, American scientist in the field of fracture mechanics and strength of materials.
Ian Johnson, 80, Australian cricketer.
John Geddes MacGregor, 88, British-American author, scholar, and priest.
Nagbhushan Patnaik, 63, Indian communist revolutionary and politician.
Gustavo Petricioli, 70, Mexican economist, heart attack.
Xiao Yang, 69, Chinese politician.

10
Clark Clifford, 91, American lawyer and politician.
Jackie Forster, 71, English news reporter, actress and lesbian rights activist.
Marvin Gay Sr., 84, American minister and father of Marvin Gaye, pneumonia.
Pierce Lyden, 90, American actor.
William Markowitz, 91, American astronomer,.
Tony Marvin, 86, American radio and television announcer.
Rachel Cosgrove Payes, 75, American novelist and author.
Konstantin Petrzhak, 91, Russian nuclear physicist.
Tommy Quaid, 41, Irish hurler, injuries sustained from a fall.
Berta Rahm, 88, Swiss architect, writer and feminist activist.
El Tappe, 71, American baseball player and coach, cancer.

11
Richard Denning, 84, American actor, heart attack.
Fred Harris, 86, English footballer.
Lars Theodor Jonsson, 94, Swedish cross-country skier.
Michael Wynn, 7th Baron Newborough, 81, British peer and Royal Naval Volunteer Reserve officer.
Spottswood William Robinson III, 82, American civil rights attorney and US Circuit Judge.
Gaius Shaver, 88, American football player and Olympian.

12
Jürgen Aschoff, 85, German physician, biologist and behavioral physiologist.
Bernhard Minetti, 93, German actor.
Julio Saraceni, 86, Argentine film director.
Ineko Sata, 94, Japanese author and communist.
Matthew Shepard, 21, American murder victim, beaten to death.
Wilson Allen Wallis, 85, American economist and statistician.

13
Thomas Byberg, 82, Norwegian speed skater and Olympic medalist.
Dmitry Nikolayevich Filippov, 54, Soviet and Russian politician and industrialist, assassinated, homicide.
P. T. Narasimhachar, 93, Indian Kannada  playwright and poet.
Bojan Pečar, 38, Serbian/Yugoslav musician, heart attack.
Jeremy Vargas Sagastegui, 27, American criminal, execution by lethal injection.
Gérard Charles Édouard Thériault, 66, Canadian pilot and Chief of the Defence Staff.

14
Cleveland Amory, 81, American author, reporter and animal rights activist, abdominal aortic aneurysm.
Leopoldina Bălănuță, 63, Romanian actress.
Dasarath Deb, 82, Indian communist politician.
Betty Gillies, 90, American aviation pioneer.
Giorgio Oberweger, 84, Italian discus thrower and Olympic medalist.
Frankie Yankovic, 93, American polka musician, heart failure.

15
Rolf Agop, 90, German conductor and academic.
Colette Darfeuil, 92, French actress.
Mãe Cleusa Millet, 75, Brazilian physician and spiritual leader.
Ike Owens, 79, Welsh rugby player.
Iain Crichton Smith, 70, Scottish poet and novelist.

16
Carlos Aldabe, 79, Argentine football player and coach.
Frank Carswell, 78, American baseball player and manager.
Jon Postel, 55, American computer scientist, complications from heart surgery.
Joseph Stamler, 86, American lawyer and judge.
M. Vasalis, 89, Dutch poet and psychiatrist.

17
Antonio Agri, 66, Argentine musician, cancer.
Germán List Arzubide, 100, Mexican poet and revolutionary.
Brian Dickson, 82, Canadian military officer and judge.
Muhammad Abdullah Ghazi, 63, Pakistani religious leader, assassinated, homicide.
Joan Hickson, 92, English actress (Miss Marple).
Carmen Molina, 78, Mexican actress, singer, and dancer.
Hakim Said, 78, Pakistani scholar and philanthropist, murdered.
Tron, 26, German hacker and phreaker, suicide.
Karel Vohralík, 53, Czech ice hockey player.

18
Frédéric Fitting, 96, Swiss fencer and Olympian.
Peter A. Griffin, 61, American mathematician, author, and blackjack expert.
Alfred Praks, 96, Estonian wrestler and Olympian.
Dick Sheppard, 53, English footballer.
George Shaw Wheeler, 90, American advisor to President Franklin Delano Roosevelt and defector.

19
Arnold M. Auerbach, 86, American comedy writer.
Frank J. Brasco, 66, American politician.
Tommy Burks, 58, American farmer and politician, murdered.
Chaduranga, 82, Indian Kannada writer.
Edward Flannery, 86, American Roman Catholic priest and author, pancreatic cancer.
Fritz Honka, 63, German serial killer.
Charlton Ogburn, 87, American journalist and author, suicide.
Compton I. White, Jr., 77, American politician.

20
John Mowbray Didcott, 67, South African lawyer and judge, cancer.
Frank Gillard, 89, British BBC reporter and radio pioneer.
Gerhard Jahn, 71, German politician, cancer.
Spike Nelson, 92, American football player and coach.
René Pleimelding, 73, French football player and manager.

21
Josef Bremm, 84, Nazi Germany Wehrmacht officer.
Scott Brower, 34, American ice hockey player, traffic accident.
Alexander Cairncross, 87, British economist;.
John Hazen, 71, American basketball player.
Nicholas Kemmer, 86, Russian-British nuclear physicist.
Hans Alfred Nieper, 70, German alternative medicine practitioner.
Alan Sainsbury, Baron Sainsbury, 96, British businessman.
Tatiana Tolmacheva, 91, Soviet figure skater and figure skating coach.

22
Eric Ambler, 89, English thriller author.
Nathalia Crane, 85, American poet and novelist.
Burton M. Cross, 95, American businessman, politician and governor.
Ajit Khan, 76, Indian actor.
Molly O'Day, 87, American film actress.
Violet Owen, 96, British tennis and hockey player.
Ángel Picazo, 81, Spanish film actor, cancer.
Francis W. Sargent, 83, American politician and governor.

23
Noel Carroll, 56, Irish middle distance runner and Olympian, heart attack.
Christopher Gable, 58, English ballet dancer, choreographer and actor, cancer.
Winnie Ruth Judd, 93, American convicted murderer.
Zangeres Zonder Naam, 79, Dutch levenslied singer, heart attack.
Barnett Slepian, 52, American physician, homicide.
Silviu Stănculescu, 66, Romanian actor.

24
Rafael Alonso, 78, Spanish actor.
Dennis Ayling, 81, British cinematographer.
Charles Barnes, 96, Australian politician.
Mary Calderone, 94, American physician and sexual education advocate.
Pino Dordoni, 72, Italian race walker and Olympic champion.
Ardalion Ignatyev, 67, Soviet track and field athlete and Olympic medalist.

25
Geoffrey Clough Ainsworth, 93, British mycologist and scientific historian.
Robin Brook, 90, British banker and Olympic fencer.
Geoff Crain, 67, Canadian football player.
Dick Higgins, 60, American artist, composer, poet, and publisher, heart attack.
John Hyland, 86, United States Navy admiral.
Gavriil Malish, 91, Soviet and Russian painter, watercolorist and graphic artist.
Susan Strange, 75, British scholar and political scientist.
Warren Wiebe, 45, American vocalist and session musician, suicide.

26
Nicholas Budgen, 60, British politician, liver cancer.
Rick Dior, 51, American sound engineer (Apollo 13, Dirty Dancing, Ransom), Oscar winner (1996), heart attack.
Kenkichi Iwasawa, 81, Japanese mathematician.
Margaret Keay, 87, British phytopathologist.
José Cardoso Pires, 73, Portuguese author.
Hugh David Stevenson, 80, Royal Australian Navy officer.
Terry Thomas, 45, American basketball player.
Selvarajan Yesudian, 82, Swiss yogi and author.

27
Alfred Gray, 59, American mathematician, heart attack.
Rosamund John, 85, English film and stage actress.
Reidar Kvammen, 84, Norwegian footballer.
Daniel Pedoe, 87, English mathematician and geometer.
Luis Prendes, 85, Spanish actor, cancer.
Gene Taylor, 70, American politician.
Klári Tolnay, 84, Hungarian actress.
Winnie van Weerdenburg, 52, Dutch swimmer and Olympic medalist.

28
Ghulam Ahmed, 76, Indian cricket player.
Cuthbert Alport, Baron Alport, 86, British politician, minister and life peer.
Sherman Block, 74, American politician and sheriff.
James L. Day, 73, United States Marine Corps major general.
Tommy Flowers, 92, English engineer and electronic computing pioneer.
James Goldman, 71, American screenwriter (The Lion in Winter, Nicholas and Alexandria) and playwright (Follies), Oscar winner (1969), heart attack.
Ted Hughes, 68, English poet and children's writer, heart attack.
Margaret Marley Modlin, 71, American painter, sculptor and photographer.
Wang Shuming, 92, Chinese airforce colonel general.

29
Anthony J. Celebrezze, 88, American politician.
Alvin M. Johnston, 84, American jet-age test pilot, Alzheimer's disease.
Gilda Lousek, 60, Argentine actress.
Paul Misraki, 90, French composer of music and film scores.
Harry Weese, 83, American architect, stroke.

30
Vishram Bedekar, 92, Indian writer and movie director.
Guido De Santi, 75, Italian racing cyclist.
Apo Lazaridès, 73, French cyclist.
Bulldog Turner, 79, American football player and coach.
Lam Van Phat, Army of the Republic of Vietnam officer.
Elmer Vasko, 62, Canadian ice hockey player (Chicago Blackhawks, Minnesota North Stars).
Heinz Westphal, 74, German politician.

31
Kenneth Darling, 89, British Army general.
María de la Purísima de la Cruz, 72, Spanish Roman Catholic nun.
Bernard J. Dwyer, 77, American Democratic Party politician, heart attack.
Vassar Miller, 74, Writer and poet.
Noah Mullins, 80, American gridiron football player.
Lou Rymkus, 78, American football player and coach, stroke.
Bob Thurman, 81, American baseball player.

References 

1998-10
 10